Eusthenica treicleiota is a species of moth in the family Cossidae and the only species in the genus Eusthenica. It was described by George Thomas Bethune-Baker in 1911. It is found in Australia, where it has been recorded from Queensland.

The wingspan is 26–36 mm. The forewings are whitish-brown, with fuscous-brown fine transverse lines and three fasciae. The hindwings are grey.

References

Moths described in 1911
Cossidae
Moths of Australia